Nalla Thangai is a 1955 Indian Tamil-language film produced and directed by S. A. Natarajan. The film stars M. N. Nambiar, Madhuri Devi, Rajasulochana, S. A. Natarajan and T. S. Balaiah.

Cast & Crew
The lists of cast and crew were adapted from Film News Anandan's database and from the film credits (see external links).

Cast

M. N. Nambiar
T. S. Balaiah
S. A. Natarajan
V. M. Ezhumalai
A. Karunanidhi
Pulimoottai Ramasami
K. Sairam
Yadhartham Ponnusamy
M. M. A. Chinnappa
T. R. Natarajan
C. K. Soundararajan
D. K. Chinnappa
M. V. Raju
P. K. Raghavan
Madhuri Devi
P. R. Sulochana
C. R. Rajakumari
M. S. S. Packiam
S. K. Venubhai
K. Shantha Devi
S. N. Lakshmi
Lalitha
Pushpalatha
K B Sundarammbal

Dance
C. R. Rajakumari
Kumari Susheela

Crew
Producer: S. A. Natarajan
Director: S. A. Natarajan
Story, Screenplay and Dialogues: A. P. Nagarajan
Cinematography: J. G. Vijayam
Editing: D. Vijayarangam
Art: M. Kuttiyapu, Ponnusamy
Choreography: P. S. Gopalakrishnan, A. K. Chopra
Studio: Central Studios

Production
The film was produced by S. A. Natarajan under the banner of Forward Art Films, a company that was owned by him. Another film with the title Nalla Thangal was produced by Madras Movietones and was released at the end of this year with a different cast and crew.

Soundtrack
Music was composed by G. Ramanathan while the lyrics were penned by Bharathiyar, Ka. Mu. Sheriff, A. Maruthakasi, K. P. Kamatchisundaram and R. Lakshmana Das. Playback singers are P. Leela, Jikki, A. G. Rathnamala, T. V. Rathnam, (Radha) Jayalakshmi, G. Ramanathan, Thiruchi Loganathan, T. M. Soundararajan and Sirkazhi Govindarajan.

G. Ramanathan himself sung the Bharathiyar song "Kooli Miga Ketpar" in the Raga Senjurutti that became popular.

References

External links

Indian drama films
Films with screenplays by A. P. Nagarajan
Films scored by G. Ramanathan
1955 drama films